Mahmud Abu Al-Fath (1885 – 15 August 1958 in Geneva) was an Egyptian journalist, founder and owner of the Wafdist newspaper Al Misri.

Biography
Abu Al-Fath was born in 1885, and his father, Sheikh Ahmed Abu Al-Fath, was a professor of the Islamic law. He studied Law at the King Fuad I University in 1906, before working as a journalist at Al-Ahram.

He was a member of the Wafd Party in 1936 and founded Al Misri in the same year, then served in the Egyptian Senate during the World War II.

In 1954, Abu Al-Fath was sentenced to 15 years imprisonment in absentia for his criticisms of Nasser. He claimed asylum in Syria, later travelling to Iraq and taking Iraqi citizenship.

References

1885 births
1958 deaths
Cairo University alumni
Egyptian newspaper founders
Egyptian emigrants to Iraq
Naturalised citizens of Iraq
Wafd Party politicians
20th-century Egyptian politicians